Fontána pre Zuzanu 2 (Fountain for Suzanne 2) is the soundtrack album to the self-titled movie by Dušan Rapoš, released on Tommü Records in 1993.

The music for the compilation was written by Pavol Habera along with record producer Vašo Patejdl. Apart from Habera, other artists such as Szidi Tobias and Jožo Ráž provided solo tracks. Tobias on "Chlap z kríža", while also on a duet entitled "Pomník šibnutým", and Ráž on "Teraz alebo nikdy". From the Czech Republic, Lucie Bílá appears ("Láska šialená").

Track listing 

Notes
 All songs performed in Slovak.

Credits and personnel

 Vašo Patejdl - music, producer
 Pavol Habera - music, lead vocal
 Boris Filan - lyrics
 Ibrahim Maiga - lead vocal

 Lucie Bílá - lead vocal
 Szidi Tobias - lead vocal
 Jožo Ráž - lead vocal

Sales
In 1999, the album was re-released in the Czech Republic as part of "The Most Selling Albums" edition.

References

External links 
 
 Fontána pre Zuzanu 2 on Discogs

1993 soundtrack albums